The 2010 Cork Junior Hurling Championship was the 113th staging of the Cork Junior A Hurling Championship since its establishment by the Cork County Board in 1895. The championship began on 10 September 2010 and ended on 31 October 2010.

On 31 October 2010, Meelin won the championship following a 1-19 to 2-09 defeat of Cloughduv in the final at Páirc Uí Rinn. This was their first championship title in the grade.

Cloughduv's Éamonn Brosnan was the championship's top scorer with 1-19.

Qualification

Results

First round

Semi-finals

Final

Championship statistics

Top scorers

Overall

In a single game

References

External link

 2010 Cork JAHC results

Cork Junior Hurling Championship
Cork Junior Hurling Championship